Patricia A. Noland (born December 30, 1945) is an American politician who served in the Arizona House of Representatives from the 13th district from 1989 to 1993 and in the Arizona Senate from the 13th district from 1993 to 1997. A Republican, she lived in Tucson and represented Pima County.

References

1945 births
Living people
Republican Party members of the Arizona House of Representatives
Republican Party Arizona state senators